Spinozotroctes is a genus of beetles in the family Cerambycidae, containing the following species:

 Spinozotroctes seraisorum Tavakilian & Neouze, 2007
 Spinozotroctes thouvenoti Tavakilian & Neouze, 2007

References

Acanthoderini